Cecil Thomas Tyson (24 January 1889 – 3 April 1940) was an English first-class cricketer, who played for Yorkshire County Cricket Club and Glamorgan between 1921 and 1926.

Career
Born in Brompton-by-Sawdon, Scarborough, Yorkshire, England, Tyson enjoyed a successful career as a left-handed batsman in League cricket in Yorkshire, and made his debut for Yorkshire at the age of 32, against Hampshire at County Cricket Ground, Southampton, in May 1921.  He scored an unbeaten century and 80 not out against a strong bowling side, and followed this with 29 against the touring Australians, and an appearance in the Bradford hosted Roses Match, but difficulties over employment terms stopped him from playing again, and he returned to league cricket with Castleford C.C.

Tyson was still eager to play in county cricket, so in 1926 he agreed to having a trial with Glamorgan and began a qualification period playing for Gowerton C.C. He continued to score heavily in the Leagues and made his debut for the Welsh county in their match against the Australians at the St. Helen's Rugby and Cricket Ground in Swansea. He also scored a composed 79 in the county's friendly with H. D. G. Leveson-Gower's XI at Cardiff Arms Park, but this proved to be his final game at first-class level. After Glamorgan failed to offer a good enough contract, he again returned to the more lucrative league cricket scene in Northern England.

He played only five games of first-class cricket, scoring 320 runs at 45.71.  He bowled 15 overs of left arm medium pace, conceding 32 runs without taking a wicket. He also played for the Yorkshire Second XI (1911) and Yorkshire Council (1920).

Tyson died in Leeds, Yorkshire, in April 1940, aged 51.

References

External links
 

1889 births
1940 deaths
Yorkshire cricketers
People from Brompton, Scarborough
Glamorgan cricketers
English cricketers
Sportspeople from Yorkshire
Cricketers from Scarborough, North Yorkshire